BosWash is a name coined by futurist Herman Kahn in a 1967 essay describing a theoretical United States megalopolis extending from the metropolitan area of Boston to that of Washington, D.C.  The publication coined  terms like BosWash, referring to predicted accretions of the Northeast, and SanSan (San Francisco to San Diego) for the urbanized region in Coastal California.  The general concept for the area described by BosWash was first identified (with the name "Megalopolis") as "The Atlantic seaboard area from north of Boston to south of Washington" by French geographer Jean Gottmann in the annual report of the Twentieth Century Fund on May 25, 1958.  Gottman elaborated on the  stretch of cities in his 1961 book Megalopolis: The Urbanized Northeastern Seaboard of the United States, although the term BosWash did not appear in the work.

BosNYWash is a variant term that specifically references New York City, which is a central hub and has long been by far the largest metropolis in the region and the country.  In 1971, The Bosnywash Megalopolis was published.

Origin
The publication of the ideas of Kahn and Wiener were part of a study commissioned in 1965 by the American Academy of Arts and Sciences, which published the results of the commission's findings in the summer of 1967 as "Toward the Year 2000: Work in Progress", a special issue of Dædalus, journal of the academy. In their portion of the work, Kahn and Wiener, discussing urbanization, began by writing the following. 
The pair went on to give rough geographic dimensions to the areas. BosWash was described as "the megalopolis that will extend from Washington to Boston" along "an extremely narrow strip of the North Atlantic coast." ChiPitts, mentioned as being from Chicago to Pittsburgh but extending east to Rochester, New York, was laid out as "on Lake Erie and the southern and western shores of Lake Michigan and Lake Ontario" and SanSan as "an even more narrow strip on the West Coast" from either Santa Barbara or San Francisco to San Diego in California.

Usage
The three terms gained use in the period immediately following publication of The Year 2000, with Newsweek using them in 1967 and Changing Times featuring them in 1968. However, the names are currently not used in any official capacity, and, of the three, only BosWash is defined in Random House Dictionary, described there as informal.

Isaac Asimov predicted in 1964 that by 2014, "Boston-to-Washington, the most crowded area of its size on the earth, will have become a single city with a population of over 40,000,000".

Virginia Tech's Metropolitan Institute outlined an area it labeled the "Northeast" megapolitan area, which it views as extending beyond Boston and Washington – past Portland, Maine and Richmond, Virginia – and described it as one of ten such areas in the United States. In the 2005 study, titled Beyond Megalopolis, researchers analyzed Google search results to determine plausible names for the regions, rejecting terms such as BosWash, stating: "We decided that combined place names seemed contrived and offered little chance for eventual adoption. Therefore, labels such as 'BosWash' to refer to the Northeast or 'SanSac' in reference to the combined San Francisco and Sacramento metropolitan areas were not considered."

See also
East Coast of the United States
Eastern United States
Megacity
Northeast Corridor
Northeastern United States
Northeast megalopolis
Unofficial U.S. multi-state regions

References

1967 neologisms
Northeastern United States
Geographical neologisms
Northeast megalopolis